Florentino Castro López (born 20 June 1949) is a Mexican politician from the Institutional Revolutionary Party. He has served as Deputy of the LVI and LVIII Legislatures of the Mexican Congress representing Sinaloa.

References

1949 births
Living people
People from Guasave
Politicians from Sinaloa
Members of the Chamber of Deputies (Mexico)
Presidents of the Chamber of Deputies (Mexico)
Institutional Revolutionary Party politicians
21st-century Mexican politicians